Hugh II of Châtillon (died 1307), son of Guy III, Count of Saint-Pol, and Matilda of Brabant, was count of St Pol 1289–1292 and Count of Blois 1292–1307.

He married c. 1287 Beatrix of Dampierre, daughter of Guy of Flanders and Isabelle of Luxembourg. They had two children:
 Guy I of Blois-Châtillon (d. 1342)
 John of Châtillon (d. 1329), Lord of Château-Renault

References

Sources

Chatillon, Hugh II of
Hugh II
Hugh II
Hugh II
Year of birth unknown